Georgi Kovachev (born 24 February 1980) is a Bulgarian footballer currently playing for  Septemvri Simitli as a midfielder.

External links
 

1980 births
Living people
Bulgarian footballers
PFC Spartak Varna players
PFC Vidima-Rakovski Sevlievo players
PFC Belasitsa Petrich players
Akademik Sofia players
First Professional Football League (Bulgaria) players
Association football midfielders
People from Veliko Tarnovo
Sportspeople from Veliko Tarnovo Province